Lin Foxhall, FSA, MBE, is a Professor of archaeology and ancient Greek History. She has written on women, men, and gender in the classical world. She is an Honorary Professor at the University of Leicester, and in 2017 she was appointed to the Rathbone Chair of Ancient History and Classical Archaeology at the University of Liverpool.

Career
Foxhall studied for her bachelor's degree at Bryn Mawr College. She received her master's degree from the University of Pennsylvania. She was awarded her PhD from the University of Liverpool in 1990 for a thesis entitled, Olive Cultivation Within Greek and Roman Agriculture: The Ancient Economy Revisited. She is the Principal Investigator on the 'Tracing Networks' Project. She is the co-director of the Bova Marina project. Foxhall joined the University of Leicester in 1993, and was made Professor of Greek Archaeology and History in 1999.

Foxhall was awarded an honorary MBE in 2001 in recognition of her contribution to the Millennium celebrations. As a bell-ringer herself, she created the “Ringing in the Millennium” project in 1996 and was awarded £3 million in National Lottery funding towards the £6 million project. Across the UK over 150 communities benefited from the project, in which new bells were installed and old bells restored.

Foxhall was elected as a Fellow of the Society of Antiquaries of London (FSA) on 5 June 2003.

In 2017, she was the Rathbone Chair of Ancient History and Classical Archaeology at the University of Liverpool.

She is a member of the editorial board of World Archaeology journal.

Publications
 "Women's Ritual and Men's Work in Ancient Athens", in Women in Antiquity. New Assessments, edited by Richard Hawley and Barbara Levick (London: Routledge, 1995) , S. 97–110
 Greek Law in its Political Setting: Justifications not Justice, edited with A. D. E. Lewis (Oxford: Clarendon Press, 1996) 
 Thinking Men: Masculinity and its Self-Representation in the Classical Tradition (= Leicester-Nottingham studies in ancient society. Band 7) edited with John Salmon (London: Routledge, 1998) 
 Olive Cultivation in Ancient Greece: Seeking the Ancient Economy (Oxford: Wiley, 2007) 
 Gender and the City before Modernity, edited with Gabriele Neher (Chichester: Wiley, 2013) , 
 Studying Gender in Classical Antiquity (Cambridge: Cambridge University Press, 2013)

References

1951 births
Living people
Alumni of the University of Liverpool
Bryn Mawr College alumni
University of Pennsylvania alumni
Women classical scholars
Fellows of the Society of Antiquaries of London